The name Louvet appearing on its own usually refers to Jean-Baptiste Louvet de Couvrai, French writer during the Revolution. Others bearing the same family name include:

 Jean Louvet (playwright) (1934–2015), Belgian playwright
 Louis Louvet (1899–1971), French tram driver, proofreader, anarcho-syndicalist activist and anarchist
 Patrice Louvet (born 1964), French American business executive